Wang Zhong (or Wang Chung in Wade–Giles) may refer to:

Wang Zhong (Three Kingdoms), general of the Cao Wei state in the Three Kingdoms period
Wang Zhong (Ming dynasty) (1359-1409), a marquis
Wang Zhong (Qing dynasty) (1745-1794), a Confucian scholar

See also
Wang Chong (27–97 AD), a Han dynasty Chinese philosopher
Wang Chung (disambiguation)